Aussevielle is a commune in the Pyrénées-Atlantiques department in the Nouvelle-Aquitaine region of south-western France.

The inhabitants of the commune are known as Ausseviellois or Aussevielloises.

Geography
Aussevielle is located some 14 km north-west of Pau and 6 km north-west of Lescar. Access to the commune is by the D633 road from Beyrie-en-Béarn in the north-east which passes through most of the length of the commune and the village before it continues south to join the D817 near Siros. The D817 from Denguin passes through the south of the commune. European route E80 passes through the north of the commune but provides no access to the commune with the nearest exit being exit 9.1 to the east. Residential areas cover some 20% of the area with the rest farmland.

The Gave de Malapet flows through the north of the commune towards the north-west. The Ousse des Bois flows through the south of the commune westwards to join the Gave de Pau south-west of the commune.

Places and Hamlets
 Cabarrouy
 Lous Campagnots
 Labourdette
 Lacoustette
 Lombré
 Poey (glasshouse)
 Sensac
 Teulé
 Lous Vignaux

Neighbouring communes and villages

Toponymy

The commune name in béarnais is Aussavièla. Michel Grosclaude indicated that the name probably comes from the name of the Ousse which rises in the commune with the Occitan vièla ("town") giving "Town of Ousse".

The following table details the origins of the commune name and other names in the commune.

Sources:

Raymond: Topographic Dictionary of the Department of Basses-Pyrenees, 1863, on the page numbers indicated in the table. 
Grosclaude: Toponymic Dictionary of communes, Béarn, 2006 
Cassini: Cassini Map from 1750

Origins:

Pardies: Notaries of Pardies
Census: Census of Béarn
Reformation: Reformation of Béarn
Denguin: Terrier of Denguin
Enumeration: Enumeration of Ausseville

History
Paul Raymond noted on page 17 of his 1863 dictionary that in 1385 Aussevielle had 10 fires and depended on the bailiwick of Pau then in 1654 reverted to the Barony of Denguin by letters patent from Louis XIV.

Administration

List of Successive Mayors

Inter-communality
The commune is part of four inter-communal structures:
 the Communauté d'agglomération Pau Béarn Pyrénées;
 the SIVU for home help for the elderly of the Canton of Lescar;
 the AEP association of Lescar region;
 the Siros, Aussevielle, Poey-de-Lescar inter-communal association for water treatment in the Val de l'Ousse;

Demography
In 2017 the commune had 785 inhabitants.

Culture and heritage

Civil heritage
The old Lay Abbey is today the Town Hall.

Religious heritage

The Church of Saint John the Baptist probably dates to the end of the Middle Ages.

Facilities

Education
Siros and Aussevielle are associated through an Inter-communal Educational Regrouping (RPI). The commune has a nursery school. There is a primary school in Siros.

Notable people linked to the commune
Roger Lapassade, born in 1912 at Aussevielle and died in 1999 at Orthez, a writer and Occitan poet.

See also
Communes of the Pyrénées-Atlantiques department

References

External links
Aussevielle official website 
Aussevielle on Géoportail, National Geographic Institute (IGN) website 
Außaviele on the 1750 Cassini Map

Communes of Pyrénées-Atlantiques